Lil Wayne has released one song video, working with many directors, as well as featuring in many other artists music videos as well. Before Lil Wayne went to jail for eight months in 2010 he shot 20 to 30 music videos to keep his fans interested in his music.

As lead artist

Collaboration videos

As featured artist

Cameo appearances

See also
 Lil Wayne albums discography
 Lil Wayne singles discography
 Hot Boys

References

Videographies of American artists
Videography